Hurley Mountain Inn is a restaurant/sports tavern in historic Hurley, New York.

History
The Inn began during the early 19th century as the “Suspension Bridge House.”  About the beginning of the 20th century it was renamed the Hurley Hotel, featuring a tavern and a one chair barber shop. During the early 1970s it was renamed the Hurley Mountain Inn.
For a few years it was known as a biker bar, but then a NY State Trooper barracks was sited directly across the street and the tavern became a tame flag-festooned family place, though thong-barings continued during its New Years celebrations. (Not to mention . of cabbage, . of potatoes and 4,000 lb of carrots!)."

The Hurley Mountain Inn was the setting for an upstate bar scene for the movie Tootsie.

References

External links
 

Biker bars
Restaurants in New York (state)
Buildings and structures in Ulster County, New York